The name Xavier has been used for three tropical cyclones and one extratropical cyclone worldwide.

In the Eastern Pacific:
Tropical Storm Xavier (1992), a weak tropical storm that did not approach land. 
Tropical Storm Xavier (2018), tropical storm that brushed southwestern Mexico. 

In the South Pacific: 
Cyclone Xavier (2006), a strong pre-season cyclone which formed to the north of the Santa Cruz Islands.

In Europe: 
Cyclone Xavier (2017), a storm that affected Northern Europe in 2017.

See also 
 Cyclone Xaver, a winter storm that affected Europe in 2013. 
 Hurricane Javier, a similar name which has also been used in the Eastern Pacific.

Pacific hurricane set index articles
South Pacific cyclone set index articles